Penthicodes pulchellus is a species of planthoppers in the subfamily Aphaeninae (Fulgoridae): found in southern India, Indo-China and Malesia. It belongs to the subgenus Ereosoma Kirkaldy, 1906. The genus name was formerly treated as feminine, but in 2022 it was revised to masculine in accordance with ICZN Article 30.1.4.4, changing the spelling of this species' name from pulchella to pulchellus.

References

Notes

External links

FLOW: Penthicodes (Ereosoma) Kirkaldy, 1906

Hemiptera of Asia
Aphaeninae